The 2017–18 East of Scotland Football League (known for sponsorship reasons as the Central Taxis East of Scotland League) was the 89th season of the East of Scotland Football League, and the 4th season as the sixth tier of the Scottish football pyramid system. The season began on 12 August 2017 and ended on 12 May 2018. Lothian Thistle Hutchison Vale were the defending champions.

The league was increased to a 13-team division as Kelty Hearts applied to switch from the SJFA East Region Super League and Preston Athletic were relegated from the Lowland League.

Kelty Hearts were crowned champions on 28 April 2018, after a 3–1 win over Lothian Thistle Hutchison Vale in their final match. They secured promotion to the Lowland League after defeating South of Scotland Football League winners Threave Rovers 10–0 on aggregate. This was the first time that the Lowland League play-off had taken place.

Teams

The following teams have changed division since the 2016–17 season.

To East of Scotland Football League
Relegated from Lowland Football League
 Preston Athletic
Transferred from East Superleague
 Kelty Hearts

 Club has an SFA Licence (as of 20 December 2017) and are eligible to participate in the Lowland League promotion play-off should they win the league.

League table

References

External links
EoSFL 2017–18 results

5
 
Sco